Abraham van Riebeeck (18 October 1653 – 17 November 1713) was a merchant with the Dutch East India Company and the Governor-General of the Dutch East Indies from 1709 to 1713.

Biography 
Abraham van Riebeeck was born on 18 October 1653 in the Dutch Cape Colony (present-day South Africa). His father was Jan van Riebeeck, commander of the Cape, and his mother was Maria van Riebeeck. When his father moved to Batavia in the Dutch East Indies (present-day Indonesia) in 1662, he sent Van Riebeeck and his brother to Holland. He studied law at Leiden University from 1673 to 1676.

After his studies, he became a merchant with the Dutch East India Company and travelled on the ship De Vrijheyt to Batavia, where he arrived 1677.

He married Elisabeth van Oosten in 1678. They had six children, Johanna Maria (1679–1759), Johannes (1691–1735), Elisabeth (1693–1723), and three others who died in their childhood.

He was Governor-General of the Dutch East Indies from 1709 until his death in 1713. He was a keen explorer, who undertook several smaller and a few larger voyages in the Indies.

Death
After he became the first person to reach the summit of Tangkuban Perahu, Van Riebeeck contracted dysentery on his way home. He was unable to recover from the disease and died on 17 November 1713 in Batavia in the Dutch East Indies.

References

External links
 

1653 births
1713 deaths
18th-century Dutch explorers
R
Governors-General of the Dutch East Indies
People from Cape Town
18th-century Dutch East Indies people
17th-century Dutch businesspeople
18th-century Dutch businesspeople
 Infectious disease deaths in Indonesia
 deaths from dysentery